Eric Gerard Laneuville (born July 14, 1952) is an American television director, producer and actor. His first acting roles were in the science-fiction film The Omega Man (1971) with Charlton Heston, and the ABC television series Room 222 (1970–1973). His role as Luther Hawkins in the television series St. Elsewhere is his best known role. He also starred in A Force of One (1979) playing Charlie, the adopted son of Chuck Norris's character. In more recent years, he frequently directs such one-hour dramas as Blue Bloods and NCIS: Los Angeles. He directed Body of Proof episode "Missing". He also appeared in Love at First Bite.

Career

Acting
Laneuville was born in New Orleans, Louisiana, the son of Mildred, a guidance counselor, and Alexander Laneuville. He began acting while attending Audubon Junior High School in the Crenshaw, Los Angeles, District.  He often played juvenile characters younger than his own age. He appeared in several musicals staged at Audubon by drama teacher Mario Lomeli, including Bye Bye Birdie, Annie Get Your Gun, and Oklahoma!. While taking drama courses at nearby Susan Miller Dorsey High School, he began acting professionally, co-starring as a troubled youth in an award-winning television movie and becoming a semi-regular cast member on Room 222, including one episode in which he appeared with his future Force of One co-star, Chuck Norris. He appeared in three episodes of Sanford and Son, as Esther's adopted son.  In 1982, he landed the role of Luther Hawkins in the television series St. Elsewhere. He stayed with the series until it ended in 1988.

As well as The Omega Man (1971), his other film appearances included roles in Black Belt Jones (1974), Death Wish (1974) opposite Charles Bronson, Shoot It Black, Shoot It Blue (1974), A Piece of the Action (1977), Love at First Bite (1979), A Force of One, (1979), The Baltimore Bullet (1980) and Back Roads (1981).

Directing
Laneuville began directing in 1984. His first directing assignments were for episodes of St. Elsewhere. He has subsequently directed episodes of L.A. Law (1986), Quantum Leap (1989), Doogie Howser, M.D. (1990), NYPD Blue (1993), ER (1995), 413 Hope St. (1997), Gilmore Girls (2004), Lie to Me (2009), Monk (2005), The Mentalist (2009–12), Invasion, Medium, Lost (2005–08), Girlfriends, Everybody Hates Chris, Prison Break, Blue Bloods, Ghost Whisperer, Grimm (2012–14) and Tommy, Chicago Fire.

In 1988, Laneuville became the first African-American television director to film in Russia, as he directed a two-part episode "Mission to Moscow" for the series, Head of the Class. In 1992 he won an Emmy for directing the episode "All God's Children" of the NBC series I'll Fly Away. He also directed the 2004 television film, America's Prince: The John F. Kennedy Jr. Story.

As his directing career took off, Laneuville's acting career continued only sporadically, usually in small cameo roles. His most recent on-camera appearance was on October 3, 2014, in a guest role on "Blue Bloods" in an episode he also directed.  Prior to that, he had appeared as Dr. Lamar in the TV series Scrubs. He also appeared in the Fear of a Black Hat (1994), a mockumentary parodying 1990s hip-hop culture.

Producer credits
Bull (Executive producer)
413 Hope St. (executive producer)
Midnight Caller (producer)
Brand New Life (supervising producer)
The Equalizer (TV series)|'' (Executive producer)

References

External links

1952 births
African-American male actors
African-American film directors
African-American television directors
American male film actors
American film directors
American male television actors
American television directors
American television producers
Primetime Emmy Award winners
Living people
Male actors from New Orleans
Directors Guild of America Award winners
Susan Miller Dorsey High School alumni
21st-century African-American people
20th-century African-American people